A fattening room is a practice in Nigeria whereby women or adolescent girls are kept away from their companions, societal interactions and also from performing their customary duties. This period may range from three months to seven years depending on the wealth of their father.

Background 

The purpose of the fattening room is to groom and mould the girl or intended bride in the traditional norms of caring for her prospective husband and her future home. A fattening room is like a traditional school where the lady or bride is moulded into a good mother, a wife, with an overall good character, that will be attractive to men. Another perspective argue that the main purpose of the fattening room is used to create plump women. This because the society that practice it believe that surplus of flesh ensures greater chances of fertility and a healthy baby. For this reason the maidens are fed on a variety of food and are taught new rituals and skills. The fattening room is also used as a retreat prior to a major social change in a person's life.

Modern view of Fattening Room 

The practice of fattening room which is dominantly practiced in South Eastern part of Nigeria, especially among the Efiks  is gradually waning down, not because it is entirely bad, but due to some ill practices associated with it. Such practices like female genital mutilation, overfeeding the bride to be and the length of time it takes to be in the fattening room are resisted. More so, this practice has been criticized to be associated with rituals that are not acceptable to Christians.

References

Nigerian culture
African culture